In dynamical systems theory, the baker's map  is a chaotic map from the unit square into itself. It is named after a kneading operation that bakers apply to dough: the dough is cut in half, and the two halves are stacked on one another, and compressed.

The baker's map can be understood as the bilateral shift operator of a bi-infinite two-state lattice model. The baker's map is topologically conjugate to the horseshoe map. In physics, a chain of coupled baker's maps can be used to model deterministic  diffusion.

As with many deterministic dynamical systems, the baker's map is studied by its action on the space of functions defined on the unit square.  The baker's map defines an operator on the space of functions, known as the transfer operator of the map. The baker's map is an exactly solvable model of deterministic chaos, in that the eigenfunctions and eigenvalues of the transfer operator can be explicitly determined.

Formal definition
There are two alternative definitions of the baker's map which are in common use. One definition folds over or rotates one of the sliced halves before joining it (similar to the horseshoe map) and the other does not.

The folded baker's map acts on the unit square as

When the upper section is not folded over, the map may be written as

The folded baker's map is a two-dimensional analog of the tent map

while the unfolded map is analogous to the Bernoulli map. Both maps are topologically conjugate.  The Bernoulli map can be understood as the map that progressively lops digits off the dyadic expansion of x. Unlike the tent map, the baker's map is invertible.

Properties
The baker's map preserves the two-dimensional Lebesgue measure.

The map is strong mixing and it is topologically mixing.

The transfer operator  maps functions on the unit square to other functions on the unit square; it is given by

The transfer operator is unitary on the Hilbert space of square-integrable functions on the unit square. The spectrum is continuous, and because the operator is unitary the eigenvalues lie on the unit circle. The transfer operator is not unitary on the space  of functions polynomial in the first coordinate and square-integrable in the second. On this space, it has a discrete, non-unitary, decaying spectrum.

As a shift operator
The baker's map can be understood as the two-sided shift operator on the symbolic dynamics of a one-dimensional lattice. Consider, for example, the bi-infinite string

where each position in the string may take one of the two binary values . The action of the shift operator on this string is

that is, each lattice position is shifted over by one to the left. The bi-infinite string may be represented by two real numbers  as

and

In this representation, the shift operator has the form

which is seen to be the unfolded baker's map given above.

See also
 Bernoulli process

References
 
 Ronald J. Fox, "Construction of the Jordan basis for the Baker map", Chaos, 7 p 254 (1997)   
 Dean J. Driebe, Fully Chaotic Maps and Broken Time Symmetry, (1999) Kluwer Academic Publishers, Dordrecht Netherlands  (Exposition of the eigenfunctions the Baker's map).

Chaotic maps
Exactly solvable models
Articles containing video clips